Pennsylvania Route 156 (PA 156) is a  state highway located in Westmoreland, Armstrong and Indiana counties in Pennsylvania. The southern terminus is at PA 981 in Avonmore.  The northern terminus is at U.S. Route 422 (US 422)/PA 56 in Shelocta.

Route description

PA 156 begins at an intersection with PA 981 in Bell Township, Westmoreland County, heading north-northeast on a two-lane undivided road. The route becomes the border between the borough of Avonmore to the west and Bell Township to the east as it heads through a mix of farms and woods with some homes. PA 156 fully enters Avonmore and heads into residential areas with a few businesses, merging north onto 2nd Street before turning east onto Westmoreland Avenue. The route turns north onto 6th Street and passes between industrial areas to the west and woods to the east. 

PA 156 crosses the Kiskiminetas River into Kiskiminetas Township in Armstrong County and becomes an unnamed road, heading into wooded areas and turning west. The road turns north to pass over Norfolk Southern's Conemaugh Line before curving northeast through more forests. The route heads to the north and runs through more woodland with some fields and homes, passing through Maysville. PA 156 continues north through more rural areas, coming to an intersection with PA 56. At this point, the route turns northeast to form a concurrency with PA 56, passing to the southeast of Shady Plain. The road heads into South Bend Township and continues east through more farmland and woodland with some residences. PA 56/PA 156 crosses the Crooked Creek and passes through South Bend, crossing the creek again and turning to the northeast, coming to an intersection with PA 210. The road enters Armstrong Township in Indiana County and heads through more rural areas. PA 56/PA 156 crosses Norfolk Southern's Keystone Power Plant Lead railroad line before heading across the Crooked Creek into the borough of Shelocta and passing homes and businesses as it comes to an intersection with US 422. At this point, PA 156 ends and PA 56 turns east to form a concurrency with US 422.

Major intersections

See also

References

External links

Pennsylvania Highways: PA 156

156
Transportation in Westmoreland County, Pennsylvania
Transportation in Armstrong County, Pennsylvania
Transportation in Indiana County, Pennsylvania